Adrian Cieślewicz (born 16 November 1990) is a Polish professional footballer who plays for Cymru Premier side The New Saints.

Career

Cieślewicz started his career with Manchester City.

References

1990 births
Association football forwards
Polish footballers
Living people
People from Gniezno
The New Saints F.C. players
Wrexham A.F.C. players
Kidderminster Harriers F.C. players
B36 Tórshavn players
Polish expatriate footballers
Polish expatriate sportspeople in England
Polish expatriate sportspeople in Wales
Polish expatriate sportspeople in the Faroe Islands
Expatriate footballers in Wales
Expatriate footballers in England
Expatriate footballers in the Faroe Islands